Xylota tarda is a Palearctic species of hoverfly.

Description
External images
For terms see Morphology of Diptera
Wing length 5·5-8·5 mm. Large red areas on black abdomen. Wing membrane not infuscated. Dorso-apical white bristle on metatarsus 1. Antero-dorsal pale hairs on the basal half of femur 3 uniform not longer than 1/4 the depth of femur. The male genitalia are figured by Hippa (1968). The larva is illustrated in colour by Rotheray (1994) ).

See references for determination (but see Speight 
for contradiction)

Distribution
Palearctic Fennoscandia South to Spain. Northern Italy (Apennines) Slovenia. Ireland East through Central Europe into European Russia and the Caucasus then through Russia to Siberia and the Pacific coast (Kuril islands).

Biology
Old woodland species running on the foliage of bushes and shrubs and on tree stumps and nearby bare ground. The larva has been found in sap runs at the base of the trunk of Populus tremula and in rotting wood of Fagus.

References

Diptera of Europe
Taxa named by Johann Wilhelm Meigen
Eristalinae
Insects described in 1822
Palearctic insects